Kâte is a Papuan language spoken by about 6,000 people in the Finschhafen District of Morobe Province, Papua New Guinea. It is part of the Finisterre–Huon branch of the Trans–New Guinea language family (McElhanon 1975, Ross 2005). It was adopted for teaching and mission work among speakers of Papuan languages by the Evangelical Lutheran Church of Papua New Guinea in the early 1900s and at one time had as many as 80,000 second-language speakers.

Dialects
The name Kâte means 'forest', an epithet for the inlanders on the tip of the Huon peninsula, excepting the people living along the Mape River (Flierl and Strauss 1977). The coastal people to the south, mostly  speaking Jabêm, are called Hâwec 'sea' and those to the north, speaking Momare and Migabac, are called Sopâc 'grass'. These were geographical rather than language names. The indigenous glossonyms referred to smaller linguistics units that can be called dialects. McElhanon (1974: 16) identifies five dialects at the time of earliest mission contact in 1886, each named according to how they pronounce a common word or phrase.
 Wana ('where?'), the southernmost dialect
 Wamorâ ('why?')
 Mâgobineng ('they are saying it') or Bamotâ ('why?'), nearly extinct in 1974
 Parec, already extinct by 1974
 Wemo ('what?') or Wena, adopted as the mission lingua franca 

Wana and Wemo are nearly identical, but they differ considerably from Mâgobineng and Wamorâ, to such an extent that these might be considered to be three closely related languages. Parec was probably a transitional dialect between Wemo and Wamorâ. The Kâte dialects formed a chain with the neighboring Mape dialects. All dialects of the chain are being supplanted by Wemo (Suter 2014: 19).

Phonology

Vowels
Kâte distinguishes six vowels. The low back vowel â (representing /ɔ/) sounds like the vowel of UK English law or saw (Pilhofer 1933: 14). Length is not distinctive.

 /e/ is heard as [ɛ] when before sounds /t͡s ɾ ʔ/ as well as nasal consonants.
 /ɔ/ can also be heard in sporadic variation as [ɒ].

Consonants
The glottal stop, written -c, only occurs after a vowel and Pilhofer first describes it as a vowel feature that distinguishes, for instance, bo 'sugarcane' from boc 'very' and si 'planting' from sic 'broth'. However, McElhanon (1974) notes that final glottal stop is barely phonemic in the Wemo dialect, but corresponds to a wider variety of syllable-final consonants in Western Huon languages (-p, -t, -k, -m, -n, -ŋ), which are neutralized (to -c, -ŋ) in the Eastern Huon languages, including Kâte. Pilhofer (1933) writes the lateral flap with an l, but Schneuker (1962) and Flierl and Strauss (1977) write it with an r. 

The fricatives f and w are both labiodentals, according to Pilhofer (1933), but bilabials, according to Flierl and Strauss (1977). Alveopalatal z and ʒ are affricates, [ts] and [dz] respectively, but they otherwise pattern like the stops, except that z only occurs between vowels, while ʒ occurs morpheme-initially (Flierl and Strauss 1977: xv). Both Pilhofer (1933: 15) and Flierl and Strauss (1977) describe the labiovelars q and ɋ as coarticulated and simultaneously released [kp] and [gb], respectively. (The letter ɋ is a curly q with hooked tail that cannot properly be rendered if it is missing from system fonts.)

 /d/ in word-medial position is heard as a flapped [d̆].
 /f/ before vowels /i, e/ is heard as a bilabial [ɸ].
 /j/ can also be heard as a fricative [ç] when before front vowels.
 /ɾ/ can be heard as a voiced lateral [ɺ] when before front vowels.
 /w/ can be heard as a fricative [β] when before vowels /u, o, ɔ/.

Morphology

Pronouns

Free pronouns
Unlike pronouns in most Papuan languages, Kâte free pronouns distinguish inclusive and exclusive in the 1st person, presumably due to Austronesian influence. However, this distinction is not maintained in pronominal affixes. The table of free pronouns is from Pilhofer (1933: 51-52). Personal pronouns are only used to refer to animate beings. Demonstratives are used to refer to inanimates.

Like nouns, free pronouns can occur in subject or object positions in clauses, although the longer form of the singular pronouns (noni, goki, eki) can only occur in subject position (Schneuker 1962: 28). Like nouns, free pronouns can also occur with directional affixes and case-marking postpositions, as in no-raonec 'from me'. go-raopec 'toward you', nâhe-hec 'with him and me', jaŋe tâmiric 'without them'. The forms in parentheses ending in -c are "emphatic pronouns" and can be added to regular pronouns, as in go gahac 'you yourself' or jahe jahac 'they themselves'.

The free pronouns can also be appended to nouns to indicate
 number, as in ŋic jaŋe (man 3pl) 'the men' and qaqazu nâŋe (teacher 1pl) 'we teachers';
 definiteness, as in ŋokac e (woman 3sg) 'the woman';
 person, as in qaqazu-ge no (teacher-2sg 1sg) 'me your teacher'.

A free pronoun coreferent with the head noun frequently marks the end of a relative clause and the resumption of the matrix sentence, as in:

Genitive pronouns
Kâte has two types pronominal genitives: possessive suffixes on nouns, and preposed free pronouns suffixed with -re after final vowels or -ne after forms ending in -c (glottal stop) (Pilhofer 1933: 54-57; Schneuker 1962: 27-32). The latter suffix resembles the invariable -ne that turns nouns into adjectives, as in opâ 'water' > opâ-ne 'watery', hulili 'rainbow' > hulili-ne 'rainbow-colored', hâmoc 'death' > hâmoc-ne 'dead', or fiuc 'theft' > fiuc-ne 'thievish' (Pilhofer 1933: 49). Examples of preposed possessive pronouns include no-re fic 'my house'; no nahac-ne fic 'my very own house'; e-re hâmu 'his/her coconut palm'; jaŋe-re wiak 'their concern/matter' (Schneuker 1962: 28).

Direct object suffixes
Direct object (accusative) suffixes come between verb stems and the subject-marking suffixes. Simple vowel-final verb stems are obligatorily affixed with -c before accusative suffixes, except when the 3rd person singular object suffix is zero. Compare mamac-zi hone-c-gu-wec 'father saw me' vs. mamac-zi hone-wec 'father saw him/her'. (Pilhofer 1933: 38-43; Schneuker 1962: 29-30)

Indirect object suffixes
Indirect object (dative) suffixes come between dative verb stems and the subject-marking suffixes (Pilhofer 1933: 40-43; Schneuker 1962: 30),

Verb morphology

Final (independent) verbs
Each finite independent verb is suffixed to show tense and the grammatical person of the subject. There are five tense forms: present, near past, far past, near future, and far future. Animate subjects are marked for three persons (1st, 2nd, 3rd) and three numbers (singular, dual, plural), although the same suffixes are used for both 2nd and 3rd person dual and plural. Inanimate subjects are only marked as 3rd person singular. Durative aspect can be conveyed by adding -e- before the present tense marker or -ju- before the near past tense marker. Two hortative moods can be signaled by subtracting final -mu from the near future tense suffix (to elicit more immediate responses) or substituting a different but similar set of final subject markers (to elicit responses over longer-terms). (Pilhofer 1933: 26-32)

Medial (dependent) verbs
Kâte displays canonical switch-reference (SR) verb morphology. Coordinate-dependent (clause-medial) verbs are not marked for tense (or mood), but only for whether their actions are sequential, simultaneous, or durative in relation to the next verb in the SR clause chain. If the subject is the same (SS) as that of the next verb, its person and number is not marked. Verbs are suffixed for person and number only when their subject changes (DS). One dependent verb may be marked for both Durative and Simultaneous if its duration is extended enough to overlap with the beginning of the event described by the next clause. (Pilhofer 1933: 35-36) The examples come from Schneuker (1962).

Other verbal affixes

Adverbial affixes
A small class of adverbial intensifying affixes can be added before final inflectional suffixes (Pilhofer 1933: 81-82). Examples include -fâre- 'all, together'; -jâmbâŋke- 'truly'; -hâmo- 'well, thoroughly'; saricke- 'well, skillfully'; sanaŋke- 'firmly, permanently'; -(b)ipie- 'futilely, in vain'. Sentence examples from Schneuker (1962: 154-158) follow.

Evolution

Below are some Kâte (Wemo dialect) reflexes of proto-Trans-New Guinea proposed by Pawley (2012):

References

 Flierl, Wilhelm, and Hermann Strauss, eds. (1977). Kâte dictionary. Series C-41. Canberra: Pacific Linguistics.
 McElhanon, K. A. (1974). The glottal stop in Kâte. Kivung 7: 16-22.
McElhanon, K.A. (1975). North-Eastern Trans-New Guinea Phylum languages. In "New Guinea area languages and language study, vol. 1: Papuan languages and the New Guinea linguistic scene," ed. by S.A. Wurm, pp. 527-567. Canberra: Pacific Linguistics.
 Pilhofer, G. (1933). Grammatik der Kâte-Sprache in Neuguinea. Vierzehntes Beiheft zur Zeitschrift für Eingeborenen-Sprachen. Berlin: Dietrich Reimer.
 Pilhofer, G. (1953). Vocabulary of the Kâte language. Madang: Lutheran Mission Press.

 Schneuker, Carl L. (1962). Kâte Language Handbook. Madang: Lutheran Mission Press.
 Suter, Edgar. (2010). The optional ergative in Kâte. In A journey through Austronesian and Papuan linguistic and cultural space: Papers in honour of Andrew Pawley, ed. by John Bowden, Nikolaus P. Himmelmann and Malcolm Ross, pp. 423-437. Canberra: Pacific Linguistics.
Suter, Edgar (2014). Kâte he 'hit' and qa 'hit': a study in lexicology. "Language and Linguistics in Melanesia" 32.1: 18-57.

External links
OLAC resources in and about the Kâte language
Materials on Kâte are included in the open access Arthur Capell collections (AC1 and AC2) held by Paradisec.
Other collections with Kâte materials in Paradisec

FPST:far past
SIM:simultaneous

Languages of Morobe Province
Huon languages